"Mi Buen Amor" is a song by Cuban American singer Gloria Estefan from her third studio album Mi Tierra (1993). It was written by Estefano and the artist with her husband Emilio Estefan, Jorge Casas, and Clay Ostwald handling its production. It was released as the sixth single from the album in 1993 by Epic Records. It is a danzón ballad that speaks of a romantic ode. The song received positive reactions from three music critics who found it delicate while one reviewer was unimpressed. Commercially, it topped the Billboard Hot Latin Songs chart in the United States. The accompanying music video features a flashback of the artist in a ballroom with her partner. "Mi Buen Amor"  was acknowledged as an award-winning song at the 1995 BMI Latin Awards.

Background and composition
In January 1993, Gloria Estefan announced that she was working on a Spanish-language album titled Mi Tierra. The artist had wanted to record a Spanish-language album reflecting her Cuban heritage since the beginning of her musical career. Before recording in English, Estefan and her band performed at Latin nightclubs;
she also remembered her grandmother teaching her old Cuban songs. Music had an important role in Estefan's family; her paternal grandmother was a poet, and an uncle played the flute in a salsa band. The singer's desire to record an album in Spanish was also influenced by her son, Nayib; she wanted him to recognize his Cuban heritage.

Mi Tierra was produced by Estefan's husband, Emilio Estefan, and fellow Miami Sound Machine members Clay Ostwald and Jorge Casas. Recording took place at the Crescent Moon Studios in Miami, Florida. Colombian musician Estefano composed four of the album's songs including "Mi Buen Amor", which he co-wrote with Estefan. It is a danzón ballad which tells of a "romantic ode". In the song, she sings "Hay amores que se esfuman con los años,/ hay amores que su llama sigue viva,/ los inciertos que son rosa y son espina/ y hay amores de los buenos como tú."  The album booklet translates it as "There are loves that vanish with the years, there are loves whose flame burns on the uncertain ones that are both a rose and its thorns, then there are true lovers like you".

Promotion and reception
"Mi Buen Amor" was released as the album's sixth single in 1993 by Epic Records. The accompanying music video features Estefan in an empty ballroom with flashbacks of when she met her lover in the same location. AllMusic editor Jose F. Promis selected the song as one of the ballad highlights of the album Mi Tierra. John Lanner of the Sun-Sentinel states that it sets to a "delicate, lilting danzonete cadence".  The Courier-Journal critic Howie Allen listed it as one of the four ballads in the album that "glide along on flowing melodies, delicate percussion, deft guitars and elegant string arrangements". The Knoxville News Sentinels Chuck Campbell was unimpressed with the track, calling it and "Hablas de Mi" "the most saccharine of the lot". It was acknowledged as an award-winning song at the 1995 BMI Latin Awards. Commercially, the single topped the Billboard Hot Latin Songs chart in the US, making it her fourth number one on the chart.

Charts

Weekly charts

Year-end charts

Personnel
Adapted from the Mi Tierra liner notes:

Performance credits
 Cachao – double bass
 Jorge Casas – double bass
 Chamín Correa –guitar, requinto
 Luis Enriquez –  percussion
 London Symphony Orchestraz –  strings
 Juanito R. Marquez – music arranger, guitar
 Los Tres Caballeros (Chamín Correa, Alejandro Correa, Alfredo Correa) – backing vocalist
 Clay Ostwald –  piano
 Rafael Padilla – percussion
Néstor Torres – flute

See also
List of number-one Billboard Hot Latin Tracks of 1994

References

1993 singles
1993 songs
1990s ballads
Latin ballads
Gloria Estefan songs
Spanish-language songs
Epic Records singles
Songs written by Gloria Estefan
Songs written by Estéfano